Johnny Zero may refer to:

Johnny Zero, a nickname of John D. Foley (1918–1999) an American military pilot who served in the United States Army Air Forces as a gunner during World War II
"Johnny Zero" (song), a 1943 song originally "Johnny Got a Zero by Mack David and Vee Lawnhurst. Song inspired by pilot John D. Foley. It was made popular by The Song Spinners.
Johnny Cypher in Dimension Zero, an American animated television series originally airing from 1967 to 1968